The Innocents (stylised as The Innøcents) is a British supernatural television series created by Hania Elkington and Simon Duric. The series premiered on 24 August 2018 on Netflix.

Premise
Two teenagers, June and Harry, run away together. However, June starts displaying abilities that throw them down a dangerous path.

Cast

Main
 Sorcha Groundsell as June McDaniel, a woman with supernatural, shapeshifting abilities known as a "shifter"
 Percelle Ascott as Harry Polk, June's boyfriend, who runs away with her
 Sam Hazeldine as John McDaniel, June's stern, overprotective step-father
 Nadine Marshall as Christine Polk, Harry's mother and a police officer
 Jóhannes Haukur Jóhannesson as Steinar, Halvorson's troubled right-hand man
 Laura Birn as Elena Askeland, June's mother and a shifter who struggles to control her power.
 Ingunn Beate Øyen as Runa Gundersen, Halvorson's wife and patient, who is suffering from the early onset of dementia
 Arthur Hughes as Ryan McDaniel, June's physically disabled older brother
 Guy Pearce as Bendik "Ben" Halvorson, a man who treats shifters at Sanctum

Recurring
 Jason Done as DCI Doug Squirries, Christine's boss whom she is at odds with.
 Lise Risom Olsen as Sigrid Vollen, a patient of Halvorson who can now control her shifting abilities.
 Philip Wright as Lewis Polk, Harry's father, who was left mentally disabled as a result of Elena shifting into him and then directly into another body.
 Abigail Hardingham as Kam, also known as Freya Gundersen, a shifter whom June and Harry come into contact with. The daughter of Runa, she fled from Sanctum when she was younger. 
 Trond Fausa Aurvåg as Alf, a private investigator and high school friend of Steinar, who agrees to help Steinar locate and capture June until things get out of control.
 Andrew Koji as Andrew, Kam's boyfriend.

Episodes

Production
The series was ordered by Netflix in August 2017. In February 2018, the title was announced, alongside the news that the series would be shot mainly in England (mostly Skipton) and Norway. Carly Paradis composes music for the show.

References

External links
 The Innocents on Netflix
 

2018 British television series debuts
2018 British television series endings
British supernatural television shows
Television series about teenagers
English-language Netflix original programming
Television series by All3Media